The Baker, later Sherston-Baker Baronetcy, of Dunstable House in Richmond in the County of Surrey, is a title in the Baronetage of Great Britain. It was created on 14 May 1796 for Robert Baker, in honour of him raising and maintaining a cavalry regiment of 500 men styled "The Richmond Rangers" for King George III. He was succeeded by his son, the second Baronet. He was a vice-admiral in the Royal Navy. The fourth Baronet was a Recorder of Helston and of Barnstaple and Bideford and a County Court judge. The fifth Baronet assumed by deed poll the additional surname of Sherston in 1923. The Baker family was settled in the Westcountry several centuries before the creation of the baronetcy. A version of the arms used by the Baker baronets (Argent, on a saltire engrailed sable five escallops erminois on a chief azure a lion passant of the third) is displayed on the mural monument in Dunchideock Church in Devon of Aaron Baker (1620–1683) of Bowhay in the parish of Exminster, Devon, first President of the Madras Presidency.

Baker, later Sherston-Baker baronets, of Dunstable House (1796)
Sir Robert Baker, 1st Baronet (1754–1826)
Sir Henry Loraine Baker, 2nd Baronet (1787–1859)
Sir Henry Williams Baker, 3rd Baronet (1821–1877)
Sir George Edward Dunstan Sherston Baker, 4th Baronet (1846–1923)
Sir Dodington George Richard Sherston-Baker, 5th Baronet (1877–1944)
Sir Humphrey Dodington Benedict Sherston-Baker, 6th Baronet (1907–1990)
Sir Robert George Humphrey Sherston-Baker, 7th Baronet (born 1951)

The heir apparent is David George Arbuthnot Sherston-Baker.

Notes

References
Kidd, Charles, Williamson, David (editors). Debrett's Peerage and Baronetage (1990 edition). New York: St Martin's Press, 1990, 

Sherston-Baker
1796 establishments in Great Britain